Three Tree Point is a low, gravelly, triangle-shaped spit jutting into the east side of Puget Sound. It is referred to on some navigation charts as "Point Pully", in recognition of crew member Robert Pulley of the Wilkes Expedition.

History

In early years of development on Three Tree Point, a dock was built on the north beach. The area then was primarily used as for resort or summer homes and cabins. As the area grew with more permanent residents, a clubhouse called "The Cove" was built with a tennis court and dance floor area, which was used frequently for events, parties, etc. During the early years of World War II, lookouts would take turns in the light tower, searching the skies for possible enemy planes.

Today, Three Tree Point is a densely populated residential area where much attention has been paid toward tree preservation.  The surrounding waters are popular among scuba divers.

See also
Burien, Washington

References

External links

photos of tug aground at Three Tree Point, also showing area as it was in 1928

Landforms of King County, Washington
Landforms of Puget Sound
Headlands of Washington (state)
Burien, Washington